The Air anime series is based on the visual novel Air by the Japanese visual novel brand Key. The episodes, produced by the animation studio Kyoto Animation, are directed by Tatsuya Ishihara, written by Fumihiko Shimo, and features character design by Tomoe Aratani who based the designs on Itaru Hinoue's original concept. The story follows the main character Yukito Kunisaki, a traveler who arrives in a quiet seaside town during summer since he does not have any more money to continue on his journey for now. He is on a search for the "girl in the sky" that his now-deceased mother told him about and was searching for too; Yukito has taken it upon himself to find this girl to finish his mother's journey. In town, Yukito meets three strange girls early on named Misuzu Kamio, Kano Kirishima, and Minagi Tohno, and Yukito begins to suspect that one of them may in fact be the girl he has been searching for.

Thirteen episodes were produced by Kyoto Animation: twelve regular episodes, and a final recap episode which summarizes Misuzu's story arc. On November 17, 2004, a teaser DVD named "Air prelude" was produced containing interviews with the cast, clean opening and ending sequences, and promotional footage of the anime itself. It was a limited edition DVD, with only 20,000 copies produced. The episodes aired between January 6 and March 31, 2005 on the BS-i Japanese television network. After the conclusion of the anime series, a mini-series which added to the Summer arc of the story called Air in Summer aired on August 28 and September 4, 2005 a week later on BS-i. Air in Summer consisted of two episodes and was produced by the same staff as the anime series.

A DVD released on March 31, 2005 called "Air Memories" contained promotional commercials for the series, staff commentaries, and clean ending sequences from the twelfth and thirteenth episodes, lasting ninety-two minutes in total. The episodes were released to six Region 2 DVDs between April 6 and September 7, 2005 by Pony Canyon in limited and regular editions containing two episodes per volume. A single DVD volume for Air in Summer was released on October 5, 2005 in Japan in limited and regular editions. Additionally, Air became one of the first anime series to be released in Blu-ray Disc format on December 22, 2006. A new version of the Blu-ray Disc box set was released on November 28, 2008 in Japan.

The twelve main episodes and two Air in Summer episodes were licensed for North American distribution by ADV Films. The episodes were released on four DVD compilations between August 14, 2007 and November 27, 2007. The second DVD volume was sold in two editions, with the difference between the two being a series box all four DVDs could fit inside. In July 2008, the license for the anime series and film was transferred to Funimation continued to produce them in North America in English. Funimation released a three-disc series box set of the Air anime on April 21, 2009.

Two pieces of theme music are used for the episodes; one opening theme and one ending theme. The rest of the soundtrack for the anime series is sampled from the visual novel's original soundtrack. This includes one insert song used near the end of episode twelve, which is also sung by Lia, and was originally an insert song from the visual novel.

Air

Air in Summer

References

External links
Air anime official website 

Episodes
Air